Oldrich Kotvan (born 20 July 1990) is a Slovak professional ice hockey defenseman playing playing for HK Poprad of the Slovak Extraliga.

Career statistics

Regular season and playoffs

Awards and honors

References

External links
 

1990 births
Living people
Sportspeople from Skalica
Slovak ice hockey defencemen
HK Trnava players
Fargo Force players
Fairbanks Ice Dogs players
HC Olomouc players
PSG Berani Zlín players
HC Dukla Jihlava players
BK Mladá Boleslav players
HC Bílí Tygři Liberec players
HC Karlovy Vary players
HKM Zvolen players
HK Poprad players
Slovak expatriate ice hockey players in Canada
Slovak expatriate ice hockey players in the United States
Slovak expatriate ice hockey players in the Czech Republic